Yaroslav Trofimov (Born 1969) is a Ukrainian-born Italian author and journalist who serves as chief foreign-affairs correspondent at The Wall Street Journal. Previously he wrote a weekly column on the Greater Middle East, Middle East Crossroads, in The Wall Street Journal. He has been a foreign correspondent for the publication since 1999, covering the Middle East, Africa, and Asia. Prior to 2015 he was The Wall Street Journal bureau chief in Afghanistan and Pakistan.

Awards
He was a finalist for the 2022 Pulitzer Prize in international reporting  for his work on Afghanistan, won the Overseas Press Club award for foreign reporting on India, won the SAJA Daniel Pearl award for the outstanding story on South Asia in 2007 and shared the SAJA award for coverage of the Mumbai bombing in 2008, among other honors. In 2021 he was awarded the Overseas Press Club Flora Lewis award citation for best commentary on international news.

Books

Faith at War: A Journey on the Frontlines of Islam, from Baghdad to Timbuktu (Henry Holt, New York, 2005). A travelogue through the post-2001 Muslim world, "Faith at War" has been long-listed for the Lettre Ulysses Award for literary journalism in 2006.
The Siege of Mecca: The Forgotten Uprising in Islam's Holiest Shrine and the Birth of Al Qaeda (Doubleday, New York, 2007). A "gripping" historical account of the Grand Mosque Seizure in Mecca in 1979 by the precursors of Al Qaeda. The book was a finalist for the Barnes and Noble Discover Great New Writers award and won the Gold Medal of the Washington Institute Book Prize, a literary award established to highlight nonfiction books about the Middle East.

Notes

References
The New York Times review of Faith at War: 
The Washington Post review of Faith at War:
Publishers Weekly review of Siege of Mecca:
Jerusalem Post review of Siege of Mecca:

External links 

1969 births
Living people
Journalists from Kyiv